Glenea subrubricollis is a species of beetle in the family Cerambycidae. It was described by Lin and Tavakilian in 2009. It is known from Vietnam.

References

subrubricollis
Beetles described in 2009